Erich Burgener (born 15 February 1951 in Raron, Switzerland) is a retired football goalkeeper.

During his club career, Burgener played for FC Raron, Lausanne and Servette FC. He played 64 times for the Switzerland national team.

See also 

List of goalscoring goalkeepers

External links
 
 

1951 births
Living people
Swiss men's footballers
Switzerland international footballers
Association football goalkeepers
FC Lausanne-Sport players
Servette FC players